The Palais de la Légion d'honneur (French for "Palace of the Legion of Honour") is a historic building on the Left Bank of the River Seine in Paris, France. It houses the Musée de la Légion d'honneur ("Museum of the Legion of Honour") and is the seat of the Légion d'honneur, the highest French order of merit.

The building is also known as the Hôtel de Salm. It is located at 64 rue de Lille, next to the old Orsay railway station (now the Musée d'Orsay) in the 7th arrondissement of Paris.

History

The original Hôtel de Salm was constructed between 1782 and 1787 by the architect Pierre Rousseau (1751–1810) for the German prince Frederick III, Prince of Salm-Kyrburg. The revolutionary government nationalised the building, and from 13 May 1804, it was renamed the "Palais de la Légion d'honneur" and became the seat of the newly created Légion d'honneur. The interior was remodeled for that purpose by Antoine-François Peyre, and new exterior sculptures were added by Jean Guillaume Moitte and Philippe-Laurent Roland. 

An additional building was added in 1866 along the then-new rue de Solférino, but the palace was burned in 1871 by the Paris Commune. A replica was rebuilt soon afterwards under Anastase Mortier, with painters Jean-Paul Laurens and Théodore Maillot providing interior decoration. An additional building was added from 1922–1925 on rue de Bellechasse in order to house a museum of the Légion d'honneur.

Influences
The California Palace of the Legion of Honor, a three-quarter scale replica of the Hôtel de Salm, was constructed in San Francisco in 1924; it houses a fine arts museum.

In Haarlem in the Netherlands, the banker Henry Hope had his Villa Welgelegen built to resemble the Hôtel de Salm. In Rochefort-en-Yvelines (near Paris), there is a larger-scale replica of the Hôtel de Salm.

The architect John Nash included a domed semi-circular bow in his design for the garden front at Buckingham Palace, inspired by the Hôtel de Salm.

References

External links 
 
 Palais de la Légion d'honneur

Houses completed in 1787
Museums in Paris
Palaces in France
Houses in Paris
1787 establishments in France
Buildings and structures in the 7th arrondissement of Paris
Domes